Zohreh Akhyani,(c. 1964) is the former Secretary General of the People's Mujahedin of Iran (MEK). She was elected on 6 September 2011 to a two-year term.

Personal life
Akhyani is originally from Shahrud, Iran. She was born around 1964. She has a daughter who was 29 years old as of 2011.

People's Mujahedin of Iran (MEK)
Akhyani joined the MEK following the 1979 Iranian Revolution. She was introduced to the MEK by her husband, Ali Naqi Haddadi (Kamal).

Zohreh Akhyani became a deputy to the Executive Committee in 1989 and a full member in 1992. In 1993, she was elected and began to serve as a member of the MEK's Leadership Council. Akhyani was the representative in Germany of the National Council of Resistance of Iran (NCRI), the political wing of the Mujahedeen-e Khalq (MEK), from 1997 to 1999 and Deputy Secretary General from 2001 until 2011.

Akhyani was elected as the new Secretary General of the MEK for a period of 2 years in September 2011 that was also the organization’s 47th anniversary.

References

Living people
People's Mojahedin Organization of Iran politicians
21st-century Iranian women politicians
21st-century Iranian politicians
Year of birth missing (living people)